Rob Mitchell (born 8 May 1976) is an Australian lightweight rower. He is a former world champion and an Australian national champion. He won a gold medal at the 1997 World Rowing Championships in Aiguebelette with the lightweight men's eight.

Club and state rowing
Mitchell's senior club rowing was from the UTS Haberfield Rowing Club in Sydney.

Mitchell rowed in New South Wales representative men's lightweight fours contesting the Penrith Cup at the Interstate Regatta within the Australian Rowing Championships from 1997 to 2000. Those crews were victorious in 1997 and 1998 .

International representative rowing
Mitchell first represented Australia aged nineteen in the lightweight double scull at the 1995 World Rowing U23 Championships at Groningen in The Netherlands where the Australians won the bronze medal. Then at the 1996 World Rowing U23 Championships in Hazewinkel rowed at three in the lightweight coxless four to a gold medal victory.

In 1997 he made his debut in an Australian senior crew – the Lyall McCarthy coached men's lightweight eight. At the 1997 World Rowing Championships in Aiguebelette, Mitchell rowed at seven behind his New South Wales and U23 team-mate Michael Wiseman to a thrilling final victory by 0.03 seconds with only 1.5 lengths separating the field. Mitchell won his first and only World Championship title. At the 1999 World Championships in St Catharines Canada, Mitchell rowed a lightweight coxless pair with Wiseman to a seventh place finish.

In 2002 in a crew with the veteran Tasmanian lightweight Simon Burgess, Mitchell raced in the coxless four at a World Rowing Cup in Munich and at the 2002 World Rowing Championships in Seville to a fourth placing.

References

1976 births
Living people
Australian male rowers
World Rowing Championships medalists for Australia